Merkaz Shabab Tulkarem is a Palestinian professional football team based in Tulkarem that plays in the West Bank Premier League.

References

External links
League at fifa.com

Football clubs in the West Bank